The Holmes Show is a Canadian television sketch comedy series that premiered on CTV on September 24, 2002. The 22-episode series stars Jessica Holmes, Roman Danylo and Kurt Smeaton. Filming took place at the CTV studios in June and August 2002. Each scene was shot twice with the second scene usually involving more improvisation. Other comedians featured include Raoul Bhaneja, Aurora Browne, James Cunningham, Jane Luk, Winston Spear, Shoshana Sperling and Scott Yaphe.

See also

Comedy Inc.
Air Farce Live

References

External links

CTV Television Network original programming
Year of Canadian television series ending missing
2000s Canadian sketch comedy television series
2002 Canadian television series debuts
2003 Canadian television series endings